The National Academy of Medicine (NAM), known as the Institute of Medicine (IoM) until 2015, is an American nonprofit, non-governmental organization. The National Academy of Medicine is a part of the National Academies of Sciences, Engineering, and Medicine, along with the National Academy of Sciences (NAS), National Academy of Engineering (NAE), and the National Research Council (NRC).

The National Academy of Medicine provides national and international advice on issues relating to health, medicine, health policy, and biomedical science. It aims to provide unbiased, evidence-based, and authoritative information and advice concerning health and science policy to policy-makers, professionals, leaders in every sector of society, and the public at large.

Operating outside the framework of the U.S. federal government, it relies on a volunteer workforce of scientists and other experts, operating under a formal peer-review system. As a national academy, the organization annually elects new members with the help of its current members; the election is based on the members' distinguished and continuing achievements in a relevant field as well as for their willingness to participate actively.

History
The institute was founded in 1970, under the congressional charter of the National Academy of Sciences as the Institute of Medicine.

On April 28, 2015, NAS membership voted in favor of reconstituting the membership of the IOM as a new National Academy of Medicine and establishing a new division on health and medicine within the NRC that has the program activities of the IOM at its core. These changes took effect on July 1, 2015.

Overview
The National Academies attempt to obtain authoritative, objective, and scientifically balanced answers to difficult questions of national importance. The work is conducted by committees of volunteer scientists—leading national and international experts—who serve without compensation.  Committees are chosen to assure the requisite expertise and avoid bias or conflict of interest.  Every report produced by committee undergoes extensive review and evaluation by a group of external experts who are anonymous to the committee, and whose names are revealed only once the study is published. Victor Dzau is President and Chairman of the Council. His six-year term began on July 1, 2014. The Leonard D. Schaeffer Executive Officer is J. Michael McGinnis.

The majority of studies and other activities are requested and funded by the federal government. Private industry, foundations, and state and local governments also initiate studies, as does the academy itself. Reports are made available online for free by the publishing arm of the United States National Academies, the National Academies Press, in multiple formats.

The academy is both an honorific membership organization and a policy research organization. Its members, elected on the basis of their professional achievement and commitment to service, serve without compensation in the conduct of studies and other activities on matters of significance to health. Election to active membership is both an honor and a commitment to serve in Institute affairs. The bylaws specify that no more than 80 new members shall be elected annually, including 10 from outside the United States. The announcement of newly elected members occurs at the Annual Meeting in October. As of October 20, 2015, the number of regular members plus international and emeritus members is 2,012. An unusual diversity of talent among NAM members is assured by the charter stipulation that at least one-quarter be selected from outside the health professions, from such fields as the natural, social, and behavioral sciences, as well as law, administration, engineering, and the humanities.

The New York Times called the NAM (then called the IOM) the United States' "most esteemed and authoritative adviser on issues of health and medicine, and its reports can transform medical thinking around the world".

Awards
The Rhoda and Bernard Sarnat International Prize in Mental Health (Sarnat Prize) was established in 1992 and is awarded annually by the Academy to recognize individuals, groups, or organizations for outstanding achievement in improving mental health. It is accompanied by a medal and $20,000.

Notable members, past and present
 Harold Amos, microbiologist and professor
 Nancy Andrews, Dean of Duke University School of Medicine
 Andrea Baccarelli, Professor and Chair of Environmental Health Sciences at Columbia University and President of the International Society of Environmental Epidemiology.
 Elizabeth Blackburn, biologist and winner of 2009 Nobel Prize in Physiology or Medicine for co-discovery of telomerase
 Patricia Flatley Brennan, Director of the National Library of Medicine
 Emery N. Brown, statistician, neuroscientist,  and anesthesiologist, Director of the Harvard–MIT Program of Health Sciences and Technology
 Namandjé Bumpus,  pharmacologist and the Chief Scientist of the Food and Drug Administration
 Atul Butte, pediatrician and scientist at the University of California, San Francisco
 Robert Califf, cardiologist, FDA Deputy Commissioner
 Ben Carson, columnist and retired American neurosurgeon, former director of pediatric neurosurgery at Johns Hopkins Hospital
 Anthony Cerami, pioneering medical researcher
 Dennis S. Charney, dean of the Mount Sinai School of Medicine in New York City
 Sarah Cleaveland, veterinary epidemiologist
 Jewel Plummer Cobb, cell biologist and President of California State University, Fullerton, 1981–90
 Francis Collins, geneticist, leader in the Human Genome Project and Director of National Institutes of Health
 Jim Collins, synthetic biology pioneer and MacArthur genius
 Toby Cosgrove, cardiothoracic surgeon, inventor, and CEO, Cleveland Clinic
 Mark Daly, statistician and human geneticist, professor of genetics at Harvard Medical School
 Kenneth L. Davis, author, medical researcher and CEO of Mount Sinai Medical Center
 Anthony Fauci Lienhard Award for Decades of Work Improving Public Health and Leadership in Shaping COVID-19 Pandemic Response
 Stanton A. Glantz, Professor of Medicine (UCSF) and prominent tobacco control researcher and activist
 Shimon Glick, Ben Gurion University, endocrinology, internal medicine, medical education and medical ethics
 Farshid Guilak, Biomedical engineering and orthopaedic researcher, Shriners Hospitals for Children and Washington University in St. Louis
 Margaret Hamburg, commissioner of the U.S. Food and Drug Administration
 Maurice Hilleman, microbiologist
 Anna Huttenlocher, a rheumatologist and cell biologist
 David Ho, a pioneer in the use of protease inhibitors in treating HIV-infected patients
 Leroy Hood, winner of the 2003 Lemelson–MIT Prize
 Arthur Kellermann, professor and founding chairman of the department of Emergency Medicine at Emory University
 Herbert Kleber, professor of psychiatry, Yale University
 Philip J. Landrigan, pediatrician and children's environmental health advocate
 Jeffrey Lieberman, chair of psychiatry, Columbia University; president, American Psychiatric Association
 Rudolph Leibel, MD, professor at Columbia University and discoverer of leptin and leptin receptor
 Alice H. Lichtenstein, senior scientist and director of Cardiovascular Nutrition Laboratory at Human Nutrition Research Center on Aging, professor at Tufts University
 Susan Lindquist, a molecular biologist and former Director of the Whitehead Institute
 Howard Markel, George E. Wantz Distinguished Professor of the History of Medicine and Director of the Center for the History of Medicine at the University of Michigan
 Jonna Mazet, professor of epidemiology at UC Davis School of Veterinary Medicine and executive director of the One Health Institute
 Maclyn McCarty, youngest member of the research team responsible for the Avery–MacLeod–McCarty experiment
 Sherilyn S. McCoy, CEO of Avon Products and former Vice Chairman of Johnson & Johnson
 Ruslan Medzhitov, professor of immunobiology at Yale University, co-discoverer of human Toll-like receptors (TLRs)
 David O. Meltzer, Professor of Medicine and health economist at University of Chicago
 Mario J. Molina, recipient of the 1995 Nobel Prize in Chemistry for discovery of impact of CFCs on ozone layer
 Sean J. Morrison, stem cell biologist and director of the Children's Medical Center Research Institute at UT Southwestern Medical Center
 Herbert Needleman, pediatrician and psychiatrist
 Carl F. Nathan, Professor of Immunology and Microbial Pathogenesis at Weill Cornell Medicine
 Peter R. Orszag, 37th Director of the Office of Management and Budget under President Barack Obama
 Nicholas A. Peppas, pioneer of biomaterials and drug delivery
 Megan Ranney, emergency physician, deputy dean of the Brown University School of Public Health, public health leader and communicator
 Frederick Redlich, dean of the Yale School of Medicine from 1967 to 1972
 James Rothman, winner of the 2002 Albert Lasker Award for Basic Medical Research
 Charles Rotimi, epidemiologist and Chief & Senior Investigator at the National Human Genome Research Institute
 Jeffrey Sachs, economist and director of The Earth Institute at Columbia University
 David A. Savitz, director of the Disease Prevention and Public Health Institute at the Mount Sinai Medical Center
 Richard A. Smith, physician
 Shirley M. Tilghman, former president of Princeton University
 Abraham Verghese, novelist and recipient of the National Humanities Medal
 Mary Wakefield, appointed administrator of the Health Resources and Services Administration (HRSA) by President Barack Obama in February 2009
 Douglas C. Wallace, geneticist and pioneer of human mitochondrial genetics
 Lawrence Weed, creator of the problem-oriented medical record
 Sheldon Weinbaum, biomedical engineer, biofluid mechanician and Distinguished Professor, Emeritus, at the City College of New York
 Kern Wildenthal, former president of the University of Texas Southwestern Medical School
 William Julius Wilson, sociologist
 Elias Zerhouni, former executive vice-dean of Johns Hopkins School of Medicine and director of the National Institutes of Health under George W. Bush

See also
 List of members of the National Academy of Medicine

References

External links
 
 List of IOM reports
 List of IOM activities

1970 establishments in the United States
National academies
United States
Scientific organizations established in 1970
United States National Academies
United States National Academy of Medicine